The CCHA Goaltender of the Year is an annual award given out at the conclusion of the Central Collegiate Hockey Association (CCHA) regular season to the best goaltender in the conference as voted by the coaches of each CCHA team.

It was first presented in 2001, and continued to be presented every year thereafter until 2013 when the original CCHA was dissolved as a consequence of the Big Ten Conference forming its men's ice hockey conference. The award was revived along with the league starting in the 2021–22 season.

The award was known as the "Best Goaltender" from 2005 to 2013.

Only one player (Ryan Miller) received the award more than once, winning Goaltender of the Year in the first two years it was conferred.

Award winners

Winners by school

Current teams

Former teams

See also
CCHA Awards

References

General

Specific

External links
CCHA awards (incomplete)

College ice hockey goaltender awards in the United States
College ice hockey trophies and awards in the United States
Central Collegiate Hockey Association